The term Olympic shooting can refer to any of the following:

 The actual shooting competitions at the Summer Olympics
 The shooting events included in the Olympic program, or by extension all ISSF shooting events, even the non-Olympic ones (it is used in this meaning particularly in the United States to distinguish ISSF shooting from a large number of other shooting sports that may be more popular there)
 The Munich massacre, an attack during the 1978 Summer Olympics in Munich involving firearms